Lakelands is the northernmost suburb of the city of Mandurah, Western Australia.

The Lakelands Estate is being developed by Peet Limited and is expected to exceed 2500 lots when completed.

Black Swan and Paganoni Lakes are a focal points of the estate with recreation areas and walking tracks.

Mandurah Baptist College is located in Lakelands and was opened in 2005. Two primary schools are located in Lakelands; Lakelands Primary School and Oakwood Primary School which was opened in 2019. The Senior High School, Coastal Lakes College opened in 2018.

To the south of Lakelands is Meadow Springs. The western side is bounded by Mandurah Road which separates Lakelands from Madora Bay and the Western beaches.

The eastern side is bounded by Mandjoorgoordap Road and The Mandurah railway line passes through the suburb. Lakelands railway station is currently under construction and due to open in 2023.

References

Suburbs of Mandurah